Plasmodium octamerium is a parasite of the genus Plasmodium subgenus Giovannolaia.

Like all Plasmodium species P. octamerium has both vertebrate and insect hosts. The vertebrate hosts for this parasite are birds.

Taxonomy 

The parasite was first described by Manwell in 1968.

Distribution 

This species was described in Africa and has also been reported in Hong Kong.

Hosts 

Known hosts for this parasite include the pintail whydah bird (Vidua macroura) and the greater blue-eared glossy starling (Lamprotornis chalybaeus).

References 

octamerium
Parasites of birds